"What I Like About You" is a song by English DJ and record producer Jonas Blue featuring vocals from Danish singer Theresa Rex. It was released as a digital download on 22 March 2019 by Positiva and Virgin EMI Records. The song was written by Lene Dissing, Peter Bjørnskov and Blue, who also produced the song.

Background
In an interview with Metro, Blue said, "It's such a special song and for me, I lyrically took it back to where Fast Car is in terms of lyrics and song. But what I like about it, is it's captured the spirit and feel of early love. It's a relationship that turned rebellious and the idea is that this person, this woman goes against the wishes of all her friends and family about being in this relationship. But she does it anyway because of the power of love and the way she feels about this person. I think a lot of people have been in that situation before and they can relate to it. But we make a positive."

Charts

Weekly charts

Year-end charts

Certifications

Release history

References

 

2019 songs
2019 singles
Jonas Blue songs
Songs written by Jonas Blue
Songs written by Peter Bjørnskov
Music videos directed by Gil Green